Shay Neal (born 4 June 1990) is a New Zealand field hockey player. He represented his country at the 2016 Summer Olympics in Rio de Janeiro, where the men's team came seventh. His sister Brooke is also a representative Hockey player.

References

External links
 
 

1990 births
Living people
Field hockey players from Whangārei
Olympic field hockey players of New Zealand
New Zealand male field hockey players
Field hockey players at the 2016 Summer Olympics
Field hockey players at the 2014 Commonwealth Games
Commonwealth Games competitors for New Zealand